Endeavour or endeavor may refer to:

People

Fictional characters
 Endeavour Morse, central character of the Inspector Morse novels by Colin Dexter
 Endeavor, the hero name for the character Enji Todoroki from the anime series My Hero Academia

Places 

 Endeavor
 Endeavor, Pennsylvania, US
 Endeavor, Wisconsin, a city in the US

 Endeavour
 Endeavour (crater), on Mars
 Endeavour, Saskatchewan, a village in Saskatchewan, Canada
 Endeavour, Trinidad and Tobago, a district of the Borough of Chaguanas
 Endeavour Bank, a submarine mountain in the North Atlantic
 Endeavour Hydrothermal Vents, a group of hydrothermal vents in the northeastern Pacific Ocean
 Endeavour Massif, a massif in Victoria Land, Antarctica
 Endeavour Piedmont Glacier, a glacier on Ross Island near Antarctica
 Endeavour Reef, north of Cape Tribulation, Queensland
 Endeavour River, in Far North Queensland, Australia
 Endeavour Strait, running between the Australian mainland and Prince of Wales Island

Awards 

 Endeavour Award, a science fiction literary award
 Endeavour Awards, a scholarship program by the Australian Government

Computing and technology 

 Endeavour (supercomputer), a shared memory supercomputer at the NASA Ames Research Center
 Endeavour Software Project Management, a server-based solution for corporate level project management
 EndeavourOS, an Arch Linux based Linux distribution
 Telstra Endeavour, a submarine cable between Sydney and Hawaii

Education 

 Endeavor Charter School, in Raleigh, North Carolina, United States
 Endeavour College, a Lutheran high school in Mawson Lakes, South Australia
 Endeavour Learning and Skills Centre, an adult and further education college in Kingston upon Hull, England

Buildings 
 Endeavour (building), a residential tower in Greater Houston, Texas
 Endeavour House, Suffolk County Council headquarters located in Ipswich, Suffolk, England

Media 

 Endeavour (journal), a scholarly journal of the history of science, technology, and medicine
 Endeavour Radio, a community radio station for Boston, Lincolnshire
 Endeavour (TV series), a prequel series to Inspector Morse

Music 

 Monstercat 019 - Endeavour, the 19th compilation album released by the Monstercat record label

Organizations 

 Endeavor
 Christian Endeavor International, a nondenominational evangelical society
 Endeavor (non-profit), an American non-profit organization that promotes entrepreneurship
 Endeavor Air, an American regional airline, a subsidiary of Delta Air Lines
 Endeavor Talent Agency, in Beverly Hills, California
 Endeavor (company), successor to Endeavor Talent Agency

 Endeavour
 Endeavour Energy, a state owned electricity infrastructure company in Australia
 Endeavour Foundation, a non-profit organisation in Queensland, Australia
 Endeavour Group, Australian drinks retailer
 Endeavour Entertainment, a home media company responsible for releasing Thomas & Friends videos in New Zealand
 Endeavour Yacht Corporation, an American sailboat manufacturer

Transport

Ships 

 Endeavour (yacht), a 1934 J-class yacht
 Endeavour II (barque), wrecked in New Zealand in 1971
 HMS Endeavour, a bark in the Royal Navy 1768–1775, commanded by James Cook
 The schooner Endeavour, which unsuccessfully attempted to salvage L'Enterprise in 1803.
 HM Bark Endeavour Replica, a modern replica of the former
 HMNZS Endeavour, any of three ships of the Royal New Zealand Navy
 STS Young Endeavour, a 1987 sail training ship operated by the Australian Navy
 National Geographic Endeavour, exploration ship of the U.S. National Geographic Society
 RV Endeavor, an Alaskan research vessel of the U.S. National Science Foundation

Space vehicles 

 Endeavour, the Apollo 15 command and service module
 Space Shuttle Endeavour, one of the retired orbiters of the NASA Space Shuttle program
 Crew Dragon Endeavour, the first SpaceX Crew Dragon capsule to take astronauts to space, on mission Crew Dragon Demo-2

Trains 

 Endeavour (train), a former passenger train service in New Zealand
 New South Wales Endeavour railcar, a diesel railcar of the NSW TrainLink network in New South Wales, Australia

Road vehicles 

 Endeavour, World Solar Challenge 2009 and 2011 vehicle by Cambridge University Eco Racing
 Ford Everest, a midsize SUV also known as the Ford Endeavour in India
 Mitsubishi Endeavor, a mid-size SUV

Fictional vehicles 
 Endeavour, a spacecraft from Rendezvous with Rama by Arthur C. Clarke
 Endeavour, an Alliance Strike carrier from Starlancer
 H.M.S. Endeavour, a starfaring ship from the Micronauts (comics)
 HMS Endeavour, the flagship of the East India Trading Company from Pirates of the Caribbean

Other uses 

 Callistemon 'Splendens', a plant cultivar also known as "Endeavour"
 Endeavour, a brand of drug-eluting stent
 Endeavor, a strategy game from Z-Man Games

See also